Tonofibrils are cytoplasmic protein structures in epithelial tissues that converge at desmosomes and hemidesmosomes. They consist of fine fibrils in epithelial cells that are anchored to the cytoskeleton. They were discovered by Rudolf Heidenhain, and first described in detail by Louis-Antoine Ranvier in 1897.

Composition
Tonofilaments are keratin intermediate filaments that makes up tonofibrils in the epithelial tissue. In epithelial cells, tonofilaments loop through desmosomes. Electron microscopy has advanced  now to illustrate the tonofilaments more clearly.

The protein filaggrin is believed to be synthesized as a giant precursor protein, profilaggrin (>400 kDA in humans). When filaggrin binds to keratin intermediate filaments, the keratin aggregates into macrofibrils.

References

External links
 Diagram at ultrakohl.com

Keratins
Cytoskeleton